Sisterhood is a comedy feature film shot in London and Governors Bay, Christchurch, New Zealand and completed in 2008. It premiered in London's West End on 23 October 2008, followed by a theatrical release in the UK. It played in competition at the inaugural The Feel Good Film Festival in Los Angeles between 22 and 24 August.

The cast includes Nicholas Ball, Maria Charles, Rory McGregor, Graham McTavish, Isabelle Defaut, Emily Corcoran, Robert Faith and Jon Gadsby.

The film was directed by Richard Wellings-Thomas, written by Emily Corcoran and produced by Emily Corcoran, Tim Hart and A Sirokh.

References

External links
 Official website
 

British comedy films
New Zealand comedy films
2008 films
2000s English-language films
2000s British films